Ma Jianrong ( born 1965) is a Chinese billionaire businessman in the textile industry, and the chairman of Shenzhou International Group Holdings Limited, a knitwear and garments manufacturer based in China.

Early life 
In 1965, Ma was born in Shaoxing, Zhejiang province, China. His father is Baoxing Ma. At age 13, Ma started as an apprentice in the textile industry in China.

Career 
Ma worked for Shaoxing Cotton Mill and Hangzhou Linping Knitting and Garment Plant in China.

Ma Jianrong started as a factory worker, and rose to become chairman of the clothing manufacturer Shenzhou International, one of China's largest garment exporters with customers including Nike, Adidas ad Uniqlo.

In 1989, Ma joined the Shenzhou International Group and served as the manager of the knitting and weaving department. In April 2005, Ma became the acting chairman of Ningbo Shenzhou Knitting Co., Ltd.

As of  November 2017, Forbes estimated his net worth at US$5.7 billion.

As of 2016, Ma is the chairman of Shenzhou International Group Holdings Limited. Ma is ranked #39 in Forbes China Rich List (2016).

Personal life 
Ma is married, and resides in Ningbo, Zhejiang province, China.

References

External links
Shenzhou Intl Executive Director Biography

1960s births
Living people
Businesspeople from Shaoxing
Billionaires from Zhejiang
20th-century Chinese businesspeople
21st-century Chinese businesspeople